Richarda Morrow-Tait (22 November 1923 – 17 December 1982) was an English pilot, the first woman to pilot an aircraft around the world, accomplishing the feat after a number of mishaps in a year and a day.

Morrow-Tait began taking flying lessons in January 1946. On 18 August 1948, the then 24-year-old left behind her aeronautical engineer husband Norman and their 18-month-old daughter Anna, and took off from Croydon, England, in a single-engine Percival Proctor IV G-AJMU, with 25-year-old Cambridge University graduate student Michael Townsend as navigator. She named the aircraft "Thursday's Child" (who "has far to go" in the nursery rhyme "Monday's Child").

They traveled east. There were rough landings in Marseille (causing minor damage) and Cyprus. They also had to wait nearly seven weeks in Calcutta, India, to replace the engine. In Japan, extra fuel tanks were installed in the fuselage for the long flight across the Pacific Ocean. Even so, they reached Shemya Air Force Base in the Aleutians perilously low on fuel. On 21 November 1948, they took off from Anchorage, Alaska. However, the engine developed trouble and they were forced to land on the snow-covered Alaska Highway near Tok, Alaska. The situation looked bleak. They were nearly out of funds, and the aircraft was unrepairable.

Townsend returned to England to resume his studies, while Morrow-Tait set about trying to raise money to continue her journey. Impressed by her resolve, some Americans started a fundraising drive and collected enough to buy her a 1942 Vultee Valiant (NX54084), which she christened "Next Thursday's Child". Reunited with Townsend, she again departed from Anchorage in August 1949. There were stops (and customs problems) in Minneapolis and Goose Bay, Labrador. They then flew via Greenland and Iceland to Prestwick, Scotland. On 19 August they reached Croydon.

She gave birth to a son, Giles Townsend, eight months later. On 2 February 1951, Norman Morrow-Tait was granted a divorce on the grounds of his wife's adultery with Michael Townsend.

Richarda Morrow-Tait died on 17 December 1982 of a blood disease.

References

1923 births
1982 deaths
English aviators
Circumnavigators of the globe
People from Linton, Cambridgeshire